Robertino Gabriel Pugliara (born 21 February 1984 in Buenos Aires) is an Argentine footballer who plays as a midfielder.

References

1984 births
Living people
Footballers from Buenos Aires
Argentine footballers
Association football midfielders
San Lorenzo de Almagro footballers
Argentine expatriate footballers
Expatriate footballers in Indonesia
Argentine expatriate sportspeople in Indonesia
Liga 1 (Indonesia) players
Persiba Balikpapan players
Persija Jakarta players
PSM Makassar players
Persipura Jayapura players
Persib Bandung players
Persebaya Surabaya players
Expatriate footballers in India
Indian Super League players
FC Pune City players